J. Jonah Jameson is a fictional character portrayed by J. K. Simmons in both Sam Raimi's Spider-Man trilogy produced by Sony Pictures and in the Marvel Cinematic Universe (MCU) media franchise co-produced by Marvel Studios. He is based on the Marvel Comics character of the same name.

In Sam Raimi's film trilogy, Jameson is the head editor-in-chief for the newspaper agency The Daily Bugle in New York City. He is introduced as a blustering, grumpy, loudmouthed individual who retains an extreme distaste for the emerging vigilante Spider-Man, and takes significant pride in carrying out an unrelenting smear campaign against him and driving a rift in public opinion on his heroics. Jameson eventually hires struggling high school student Peter Parker as a freelance photographer, as he remained the sole person able to capture clear photos of Spider-Man for the newspaper, unaware that Parker and Spider-Man are one and the same. He later hires Eddie Brock to expose a perceived history of Spider-Man's criminal activity, only to reluctantly fire and retract his photos upon the revelation they were doctored from similar pictures taken by Parker himself.

An alternate Jameson appears in the MCU, depicted as an executive reporter of a sensationalist news site called TheDailyBugle.net, intent on similarly defaming Spider-Man after his civilian persona is exposed through the use of doctored footage provided by an associate of the supervillain Mysterio. He eventually hires Betty Brant, one of Parker's classmates from the Midtown School of Science and Technology, as an unpaid intern to aid his ongoing efforts to expose the vigilante. He is later contacted by Parker himself in an attempt to lure several displaced villains from the multiverse to the Statue of Liberty in order to cure and return them to their respective realities, before completely losing memory of Parker alongside the rest of the world as a result of a magic spell cast by Doctor Strange.

Originally appearing in Spider-Man (2002) and its sequels Spider-Man 2 (2004) and Spider-Man 3 (2007), Simmons’ portrayal has been universally praised and as a result, he voiced the character in a video game film tie-in, multiple television series and specials including recurring appearances on Robot Chicken, Ultimate Spider-Man, Avengers Assemble, Hulk and the Agents of S.M.A.S.H., and Lego Marvel Super Heroes: Maximum Overload, as well as guest appearances on The Avengers: Earth's Mightiest Heroes and The Simpsons.

The MCU version of the character, inspired by Alex Jones and InfoWars, has appeared thus far in the films Spider-Man: Far From Home (2019) and Spider-Man: No Way Home (2021), and the web series The Daily Bugle (2019–present). Simmons also makes an uncredited cameo appearance in the Sony's Spider-Man Universe (SSU) film Venom: Let There Be Carnage (2021).

Creation and characterization 

J. Jonah Jameson first premiered as a comic book character in the comic book The Amazing Spider-Man issue #1 (March 1963). Stan Lee stated in an interview on Talk of the Nation that he modeled J. Jonah Jameson as a much grumpier version of himself. Later Spider-Man writers Tom DeFalco and Gerry Conway agreed that J. Jonah Jameson was as close as Lee ever came to a self-portrayal, with Conway elaborating that "just like Stan is a very complex and interesting guy who both has a tremendously charismatic part of himself and is an honestly decent guy who cares about people, he also has this incredible ability to go immediately to shallow. Just, BOOM, right to shallow. And that's Jameson". Conway stated that whenever he wrote Jameson's dialogue, he would hear it in Lee's voice, and on one occasion even wrote a Jameson speech that was almost directly quoted from a Stan Lee speech.

A live-action series, The Amazing Spider-Man featured J. Jonah Jameson as a recurring character first portrayed by David White in the pilot and later portrayed by Robert F. Simon for the remainder of the series. It was produced by Columbia Pictures Television and aired from 1977 to 1979.

In 1998, Sony Pictures Entertainment acquired the film and television rights to Spider-Man also including 900 characters related to the character. It is perpetual provided that Sony releases a new Spider-Man film at least once every 5.75 years. The character was featured in a trilogy of live-action films directed by Sam Raimi with J. K. Simmons portraying the role of J. Jonah Jameson, with installments released from 2002 to 2007. The character served as a major source of comic relief throughout the series. Portrayed as a blustering, bombastic, obsessed, hyperactive man, this version of Jameson retains his dislike for Spider-Man and takes delight in anything that might discredit or defame him, but remains a good man at his core. In April 2014, Simmons expressed interest in reprising his role as J. Jonah Jameson in Marc Webb's The Amazing Spider-Man duology should the studio offer him the role.

For The Amazing Spider-Man 2 (2014), a scene was written and storyboarded, but never filmed for Jameson. It would've had Jameson and Robbie Robertson appear in The Daily Bugle building during Spider-Man and Electro's final showdown, with the hero and villain crashing through the walls and wrecking the office, much to Jameson's loud disdain. While Jameson does not appear in the final film, it is shown that Peter Parker is working for him by providing him with photographs of Spider-Man, and that Jameson is still slandering him.

Sony's licensing agreement with Marvel Studios 
In December 2014, following the hacking of Sony Pictures' computers, Sony and Marvel Studios were revealed to have had discussions about allowing Spider-Man to appear in the 2016 Marvel Cinematic Universe film Captain America: Civil War (2016) while having control of the film rights remaining with Sony. However, on February 9, 2015, Sony Pictures and Marvel Studios announced that Spider-Man and majority of his supporting characters would appear in the Marvel Cinematic Universe (MCU), with the character appearing in an MCU film and Sony releasing a Spider-Man film co-produced by Marvel Studios president Kevin Feige and Amy Pascal. Sony Pictures would continue to own, finance, distribute, and exercise final creative control over the Spider-Man films. In February 2016, Simmons expressed his interest in reprising his role as Jameson for Spider-Man: Homecoming (2017) if Marvel approached him upon learning of a Change.org petition demanding his return, but acknowledged that he hadn't the authority to decide if he could return or not.

Simmons briefly reprises his role as a re-imagined version of J. Jonah Jameson in the live-action film Spider-Man: Far From Home (2019). This makes J. Jonah Jameson the first live-action character to be portrayed by the same actor in two different franchises. However, this version of the character is unrelated to the version that Simmons first portrayed in Raimi's trilogy. Instead, this J. Jonah Jameson appears as the host of TheDailyBugle.net, a sensationalist "InfoWars-type video platform." Director Jon Watts noted that Simmons' performance was over-the-top in Raimi's films, but now that same performance has real-world comparisons, such as Alex Jones. According to Feige, the changes in the real world also meant that moving the character from a newspaper editor to a "radical right news journalist that kind of scream[s] in front of the camera" made more sense. Simmons said he and Watts did not see "eye to eye" on the film's contemporary portrayal of the character versus his performance in Raimi's films.

The filmmakers did not want to include the Raimi version's memorable flat-top haircut or mustache; but when expressed this to Simmons, he negotiated with them to keep the mustache, insisting that the character's most important thing was that "he's still the same blowhard and he does have the same damn mustache, close to it, and cigar at least".

Simmons announced that he has signed on to play J. Jonah Jameson for more films in the Marvel Cinematic Universe.

Fictional character biography

Sam Raimi film series

Campaign against Spider-Man 

J. Jonah Jameson is the editor-in-chief of the Daily Bugle, with a personal disliking of the vigilante Spider-Man, considering him a "menace". He hires Peter Parker as a freelance photographer due to Parker taking clear photos of the vigilante, leading to the Bugle sales getting higher due to Spider-Man. Jameson is also shown to have a cynical, avuncular attitude and brusque manner with his staff, though he willingly protects Parker when the Green Goblin demands to know the identity of Spider-Man's photographer.

Spider-Man's retirement and return 

Two years later, Jameson admits that Spider-Man is a hero, but refuses to talk openly about it. After Spider-Man disappears, a garbage man finds his suit and sells it to Jameson, who believes he successfully convinced Spider-Man to quit, publicly announcing it in his newspaper, and putting on the abandoned Spidey suit and cosplaying as Spider-Man behind closed doors. However, after crime and danger is noted as subsequently on the rise and his son John's fiancée, Mary Jane Watson, is kidnapped by Doctor Octopus, Jameson publicly admits to his staff that Spider-Man is a hero, but once the vigilante returns, taking his suit back from Jameson's office, he recants his statements. After Mary Jane is rescued by Spider-Man, at the wedding of his son John, Mary Jane leaves John at the altar, to which Jameson (having paid for the wedding) asks his wife to get a refund on the food.

Hiring Eddie Brock 

One year later, now taking heart medication for stress, Jameson orders Parker and new hire Eddie Brock to obtain a photograph of Spider-Man proving his true criminal nature in exchange for earning a secure staff job in place of their usual freelance work, which Brock seemingly obtains. After Parker exposes Brock as having doctored his photo from one of Parker's own, Jameson immediately fires him and has the newspaper print their first retraction in 20 years. During a subsequent fight between the symbiote Venom and the Sandman against Spider-Man and the New Goblin, Jameson, unable to locate Parker, reluctantly buys a camera from a little girl in the surrounding crowd for one hundred dollars. After Jameson attempts to take a photograph of the battle, he finds that the camera contains no film, which the smiling little girl says will cost "extra", infuriating Jameson.

Marvel Cinematic Universe

Exposing Spider-Man's identity 

Jameson works as the host of the sensationalist news website TheDailyBugle.net. In 2024, Jameson is provided a doctored video exposing Spider-Man's identity as Peter Parker by William Ginter Riva, a former working associate of Mysterio, prompting him to broadcast it to the entire world. He frames Parker for the attack in London, claiming Mysterio as a hero, and Spider-Man as a murderer. After doing so, he wages a media misinformation war against Parker.

Defaming Spider-Man 

After exposing Parker's identity publicly, he focuses on proving further that Spider-Man is a menace. He hires Betty Brant as an intern to manage the company's TikTok account, and would correct her if she spoke too highly of Spider-Man. He also reports on Parker's first day of school.

Months later, The Daily Bugle crew set up an interview with Jameson and electrical worker Nelson Burke, who witnessed Spider-Man's fight with Electro and tells his accurate account of events. Jameson discredits Burke and ends the interview, before going to the building of the apartment where Parker is hiding, witnessing his fight against the Green Goblin. He then broadcasts a live stream from the site, reporting the death of May Parker and attacking Parker for the chaos he brought, all while Parker watches him in Times Square.

Hours later, Parker contacts Jameson so he could lure the multiversal villains to the Statue of Liberty to cure them and send them back to their respective universes. Afterwards, Jameson's memory of Parker is erased but continues his war against Spider-Man a few weeks later.

In other media

Television 
 Keith Carradine voiced the character in Spider-Man: The New Animated Series (2003), an alternate sequel to Raimi's original film that is considerably more dark and gritty than previous Spider-Man adaptations.

Film 
 In the mid-credits scene of the Sony's Spider-Man Universe film Venom: Let There Be Carnage (2021), Eddie Brock and Venom are teleported from their universe into the MCU as a result of Dr. Stephen Strange's first spell in No Way Home. In the scene, Brock and Venom watch a broadcast of Jameson's that focuses on Spider-Man's identity.

Video games 
 Jay Gordon voices the character in the first two Raimi films' video game adaptations, Spider-Man (2002, Xbox) and Spider-Man 2 (2004). Simmons reprises the role in the PSP version of Spider-Man 2.
 Simmons fully reprises his role from the films in the video game adaptation of Spider-Man 3 (2007), replacing Gordon.
 Spider-Man pinball, a game based on the Raimi trilogy, features new audio lines of Simmons as Jameson.

Reception 
Simmons’ performance as J. Jonah Jameson in both live-action and in animation has been universally praised by both audiences and critics.

Far From Home director Jon Watts explained that they approached Simmons "as late as possible" before the film's release to ask him to reprise his role from Sam Raimi's Spider-Man film trilogy, hoping to keep the cameo a surprise for fans. Watts stated that he never considered another actor, saying, "It's gotta be him. Like, if it wasn't him, it wasn't worth doing."

Notes

See also 
 Characters of the Marvel Cinematic Universe

References

External links 
 
 
 J. Jonah Jameson on the Marvel Cinematic Universe Wiki
 

Characters created by David Koepp
Characters created by Sam Raimi
Fictional characters from New York City
Fictional misers
Fictional newspaper editors
Fictional newspaper publishers (people)
Fictional reporters
Film and television memes
Film characters introduced in 2002 
Film characters introduced in 2019 
Male film villains
Marvel Cinematic Universe characters
Spider-Man (2002 film series)
Spider-Man (2017 film series)
Spider-Man film characters
Superhero film characters